Cato's Letters were essays by British writers John Trenchard and Thomas Gordon, first published from 1720 to 1723 under the pseudonym of Cato (95–46 BC), the implacable foe of Julius Caesar and a famously stalwart champion of Roman traditionalism (mos maiorum).

Purpose 

The Letters are considered a seminal work in the tradition of the Commonwealth men. The 144 essays were published originally in the London Journal, later in the British Journal, condemning corruption and lack of morality within the British political system and warning against tyrannical rule and abuse of power.

Publication 
The Letters were collected and printed as Essays on Liberty, Civil and Religious. A measure of their influence is attested by six editions printed by 1755. A generation later their arguments immensely influenced the ideals of the American Revolution. According to Peter Karsten's Patriot-Heroes in England and America, Cato's Letters were the most common holdings on the bookcases of the founding fathers.

Influence 

These letters also provided inspiration and ideals for the American Revolutionary generation. The essays were distributed widely across the Thirteen Colonies, and frequently quoted in newspapers from Boston to Savannah, Georgia.  Renowned historian Clinton Rossiter stated "no one can spend any time on the newspapers, library inventories, and pamphlets of colonial America without realizing that Cato's Letters rather than John Locke's Civil Government was the most popular, quotable, esteemed source for political ideas in the colonial period."

The Cato Institute, a Washington, D.C., think tank founded by Edward H. Crane in 1977, takes its name from Cato's Letters.

Other pseudonymous "Cato letters" 

Unrelated to the Trenchard and Gordon letters, two different letter-writers in eighteenth-century America also used Cato as a pseudonym in writing political letters for publication.

One "Cato" wrote a series of essays arguing against American independence in the Pennsylvania Gazette, which were published in April 1776. According to Thomas Paine biographer Moncure D. Conway, this "Cato" was Reverend Dr. William Smith, an influential Anglican minister in Philadelphia. His views were opposed in letters signed by "The Forester," apparently Paine.

Cato was later used as a pseudonym in a series of letters to the New York Journal in 1787 and 1788 opposing James Madison's views and urging against ratification of the United States Constitution (the view known as Anti-Federalism). Many historians attribute these letters to George Clinton, though their authorship has not been definitively proven. Alexander Hamilton published responses to these letters under the pseudonym "Caesar."

References

External links 

 Cato's Letters (Volume I)
 Cato's Letters (Volume II)
 Cato's Letters (Volume III)
 Cato's Letters (Volume IV)

1720s essays
American Enlightenment
British essays
Essay collections
Essays about politics
Republicanism in the United Kingdom
Works about British politics
Cato the Younger